The Bisson class consisted of six destroyers built for the French Navy during the 1910s. One ship was lost during the First World War, but the others survived to be scrapped afterwards.

Design and description
The Bisson class were enlarged versions of the preceding  built to a more standardized design. Designed to displace , they displaced  at normal load. Their crew numbered 80–83 men.

The ships were powered by a pair of steam turbines, each driving one propeller shaft using steam provided by four Indret water-tube boilers.

The primary armament of the Bisson-class ships consisted of two  Modèle 1893 guns in single mounts, one each fore and aft of the superstructure, and four  Modèle 1902 guns distributed amidships. They were also fitted with two twin mounts for  torpedo tubes amidships.

Ships
 
The class is named in tribute to the French Admiral Hippolyte Bisson who sacrificed himself aboard the ship Panayoti in 1827 during the Greek War of Independence.

Service history

References

Bibliography

 
 
 
 

 
Destroyer classes
Destroyers of the French Navy
 
Ship classes of the French Navy